The Lindenwood Lions men's basketball team represents Lindenwood University in St. Charles, Missouri, United States. The Lions currently compete in the NCAA Division I Ohio Valley Conference.

The team is currently led by head coach Kyle Gerdeman.

Postseason results

NAIA Division II Tournament results
The Lions appeared in the NAIA Division II men's basketball tournament two times, with a combined record of 4–2.

See also
Lindenwood Lions women's basketball

References

External links
Website